Brooke is a village and civil parish in the South Norfolk district of Norfolk, England, about 7 miles south of Norwich and roughly equidistant from Norwich and Bungay.

History
Brook's name is of Anglo-Saxon origin and derives from the Old English for a small stream.

In the Domesday Book, Brooke is described as consisting of 41 households which belong to Bury St Edmunds Abbey.

Geography
According to the 2011 Census, the population of Brooke and Howe is 1,399 people.

St. Peter's Church
Brooke's Parish Church is dedicated to Saint Peter and is one of the 124 remaining round-tower churches in Norfolk.

Places of Interest
Primary-age children attend Brooke Primary School, located in the village.

Brooke's village public house is called 'The White Lion' and dates back to the 1800s.

Governance
An electoral ward of the same name exists. This ward had a total population of 2,662 at the 2011 Census.

Notable Residents
 Sir Astley Cooper- British surgeon and anatomist
 Edward Seago- English artist
 Bernard Matthews- founder of Bernard Matthews Farms
 Caroline Cossey- British model and actress

War Memorial
Brooke War Memorial is a stone cross memorial located in St. Peter's Churchyard and lists the following for the First World War:
 Leading-Seaman Christopher Jay (1883-1914), HMS Hawke
 Sergeant Charles R. Burroughs (1890-1914), 1st Battalion, Royal Norfolk Regiment
 Lance-Corporal Matthew A. Evans (1881-1918), 10th Battalion, Lancashire Fusiliers
 Lance-Corporal R. Charles Sturman (1894-1916), 7th Battalion, Royal Norfolk Regiment
 Gunner Cecil R. Parfitt (1878-1917), 25th (Anti-Aircraft) Company, Royal Garrison Artillery
 Private George Cooper (1892-1916), 3rd Battalion, Coldstream Guards
 Private Llewellyn Dredge (d.1915), 1st Battalion, Essex Regiment
 Private E. E. Victor French (1898-1918), 1st Battalion, Essex Regiment 
 Private Charles H. Bullen (1880-1918), 2nd Battalion, Royal Fusiliers
 Private George A. Turner (1883-1916), 9th Battalion, Royal Fusiliers
 Private Robert Sayer (1883-1916), 1st Battalion, Royal Norfolk Regiment
 Private Charles R. Baldwin (1893-1915), 4th Battalion, Royal Norfolk Regiment
 Private Edwin J. Cubitt (1894-1917), 4th Battalion, Royal Norfolk Regiment
 Private Frederick J. Sayer (1896-1917), 4th Battalion, Royal Norfolk Regiment
 Private James P. Norman (1897-1917), 8th Battalion, Royal Norfolk Regiment
 Private Sidney G. Sturman (1891-1915), 8th Battalion, Royal Norfolk Regiment
 Private Harry B. J. Whitwood (1894-1917), 1st Battalion, Queen's Own Royal West Kent Regiment

And, the following for the Second World War:
 Flight-Sergeant Frederick G. Clarke (1925-1945), Royal Air Force
 Sergeant Peter B. Corbett (1917-1941), No. 90 Squadron RAF
 Gunner Frederick S. Sayer (1919-1941), 3rd Maritime Regiment, Royal Artillery
 Private Edward A. C. Utting (1924-1944), 2/5th Battalion, Queen's Royal Regiment (West Surrey)
 D. Gooch

Furthermore, a brass plaque is located inside St. Peter's Church commemorating the following from the Boxer Rebellion:
 Assistant-Paymaster Arthur Bunbury (1877-1900), HMS Hermione

Notes

External links
St Peter's on the European Round Tower Churches Website

 
Villages in Norfolk
Civil parishes in Norfolk